A French drain (also called a weeping tile,trench drain, filter drain, blind drain, rubble drain, rock drain, drain tile, perimeter drain, land drain, French ditch, sub-surface drain, sub-soil drain, or agricultural drain) is a trench filled with gravel or rock, or both, with or without a perforated pipe that redirects surface water and groundwater away from an area. The perforated pipe is called a weeping tile (also called a drain tile or perimeter tile). When the pipe is draining, it "weeps", or exudes liquids. It was named during a time period when drainpipes were made from terracotta tiles.

French drains are primarily used to prevent ground and surface water from penetrating or damaging building foundations and as an alternative to open ditches or storm sewers for streets and highways. Alternatively, French drains may be used to distribute water, such as a septic drain field at the outlet of a typical septic tank sewage treatment system. French drains are also used behind retaining walls to relieve ground water pressure.

History and construction 
The earliest forms of French drains were simple ditches that were pitched from a high area to a lower one and filled with gravel. These may have been invented in France but Henry Flagg French (1813–1885) of Concord, Massachusetts, a lawyer and Assistant U.S. Treasury Secretary described and popularized them in Farm Drainage (1859). French's own drains were made of sections of ordinary roofing tile that were laid with a  gap in between the sections to admit water. Later, specialised drain tiles were designed with perforations. To prevent clogging, the size of the gravel varied from coarse in the center to fine on the outside and was selected contingent on the gradation of the surrounding soil. The sizes of particles were critical to prevent the surrounding soil from washing into the pores, i. e., voids between the particles of gravel and thereby clogging the drain. The later development of geotextiles greatly simplified this technique.

Ditches are dug manually or by a trencher. An inclination of 1 in 100 to 1 in 200 is typical. Lining the bottom of the ditch with clay or plastic pipe increases the volume of water that can flow through the drain. Modern French drain systems are made of perforated pipe, for example weeping tile surrounded by sand or gravel, and geotextile or landscaping textile. Landscaping textiles prevent migration of the drainage material and prevent soil and roots from entering and clogging the pipe. The perforated pipe provides a minor subterranean volume of storage for water, yet the prime purpose is drainage of the area along the full length of the pipe via its perforations and to discharge any surplus water at its terminus. The direction of percolation depends on the relative conditions within and without the pipe.

Subsurface drainage systems have been used for centuries. They have many forms that are similar in design and function to the traditional French drain.

Drainage system structure
Variations of French drain include:

A French drain can end, i.e., open at a downhill slope, dry well, or rain garden where plants absorb and hold the drained water. This is useful if city water systems or other wastewater areas are unavailable.

Sizing considerations

Depending on the expected level and volume of rain water or runoff, French drains can be widened or also founded on two or three underground drain pipes. Multiple pipes also provide for redundancy, in case one pipe becomes overfilled or clogged by a rupture or defect in the piping. A pipe might become overfilled if it is on a side of the drain which receives a much larger volume of water, such as one pipe being closer to an uphill slope, or closer to a roofline that drips near the French drain. When a pipe becomes overfilled, water can seep sideways into a parallel pipe, as a form of load-balancing, so that neither pipe becomes slowed by air bubbles, as might happen in a full-pipe with no upper air space.

Filters and envelopes  
 Filters – Permeable materials, typically non-woven fabric, may include sand and gravel, placed around the drainage pipe or envelope to restrict migration of from the surrounding soils.
 Envelopes – Gravel, stone, rock, or surrounding pipe. These are permeable materials placed around pipe or drainage products to improve flow conditions in the area immediately around the drain and for improving bedding and structural backfill conditions.

Foundations 

French drains are often installed around a home foundation in two different ways, or in combination of both:

 Buried around the external side of the foundation wall
 Installed underneath the basement floor on the inside perimeter of the basement

In most homes, an external French drain or drain tile is installed around the foundation walls before the foundation soil is backfilled. It is laid on the bottom of the excavated area, and a layer of stone is laid on top.  In many cases, a filter fabric is then laid on top of the stone to keep fine sediments and particles from entering. Once the drain is installed, the area is backfilled and the system is left alone until it clogs.

Other uses
They can be used in farmers' fields for the tile drainage of waterlogged fields. Such fields are called "tiled". Weeping tiles can be used anywhere that soil needs to be drained.

Weeping tiles are used for the opposite reason in septic drain fields for septic tanks. Clarified sewage from the septic tank is fed into weeping tiles buried shallowly in the drain field. The weeping tile spreads the liquid throughout the drain field.

Permitting 
In the US, municipalities may require permits for building drainage systems as federal law requires water sent to storm drains to be free of certain contaminants and sediment.

In the UK, local authorities may have specific requirements for the outfall of a French drain into a ditch or watercourse.

Gallery

See also 
Dry well
Infiltration basin
Percolation trench
Rubble trench foundation
Tile drain
Sustainable drainage system

References

External links 
 
 Non-residential French drains are regulated in the U.S. - US EPA
 How to Install French Drains
What are French drains?  Why are they called French drains?

Environmental engineering
Hydraulic structures
Sewerage
Water streams
Drainage
Foundations (buildings and structures)
Stormwater management